The 1975–76 Centenary Gents basketball team represented Centenary College of Louisiana as an NCAA Division I Independent during the 1975–76 college basketball season. The team was coached by Larry Little and played their home games at Gold Dome in Shreveport, Louisiana. Led by senior center Robert Parish, future Naismith Memorial Basketball Hall of Fame and College Basketball Hall of Fame inductee, the Gents were ranked in the Associated Press poll a total of 11 (of 17) weeks that season. Centenary finished with an overall record of 22–5 and a No. 19 ranking in the final AP poll.

Roster

Schedule and results

|-
!colspan=9 style=| Regular Season

Rankings

Awards and honors
Robert Parish – Second-Team All-American (AP)

1976 NBA Draft

References 

Centenary Gentlemen basketball seasons
Centenary
Centenary
Centenary